The Tarzan/Lone Ranger Adventure Hour is an animated television series produced by Filmation that aired on CBS during the early 1980s.

The series consisted of reruns of Tarzan, Lord of the Jungle paired with new episodes of Filmation's versions of The Lone Ranger and, in the second season, The New Adventures of Zorro, at which point the series was retitled The Tarzan/Lone Ranger/Zorro Adventure Hour. The series ran from 1980 to 1982.

Don Diamond who voiced Sergeant Gonzales in this animated series previously portrayed Corporal Reyes in Disney's 1950s live-action series of Zorro.

Voice cast

Tarzan, Lord of the Jungle (1980–1982)

 Robert Ridgely as Tarzan

The Lone Ranger (1980–1982)

 14 episodes, each consisting of two 15-minute shorts.
 William Conrad as The Lone Ranger (credited as "J. Darnoc", Conrad spelled backwards)
 Ivan Naranjo as Tonto
 Frank Welker as various characters (uncredited)

The New Adventures of Zorro (1981–1982)

 Henry Darrow as Zorro / Don Diego de la Vega
 Julio Medina as Miguel
 Eric Mason as Captain Ramon
 Don Diamond as Sergeant Gonzales

Home media
BCI Eclipse Entertainment (under its Ink & Paint classic animation entertainment brand) released The Lone Ranger (which was formerly owned by Entertainment Rights and was later acquired by Classic Media, then it was bought by DreamWorks Animation in 2012 and renamed into DreamWorks Classics and ultimately become the property of Universal Studios as of 2016) and The New Adventures of Zorro on DVD. However, the rights to the Tarzan property rest with the estate of Edgar Rice Burroughs, and as such, their authorization is needed for the series to be released.

 The New Adventures of The Lone Ranger and Zorro - Volume One (December 18, 2007)
 The New Adventures of The Lone Ranger and Zorro - Volume Two (July 15, 2008)

References

External links
 
 
 

1981 American television series debuts
1983 American television series endings
1980s American animated television series
CBS original programming
Animated Tarzan television series
Tarzan
Zorro television series
Television series by Filmation
American children's animated action television series
American children's animated adventure television series